The transportation of the President of South Korea includes a variety of vehicles for the president maintained by the South Korean Government. Because of their role as Commander-in-Chief they exclusively use military transports for international travel.  However, the civilian Presidential Security Service operates the President's motorcade.

Aircraft
 
Since 2010, whenever the President is on board a military flight its call sign is Code One. Also, a highly modified Boeing 747-400 has served as the current Code One. Its lease comes to an end in 2020 where the Presidential bidding process will begin.

Since 2007, three highly modified Sikorsky S-92 have served as the Presidential Helicopter’s, as they're it takes the president and his family from the Blue House to Seoul Air Base, where Code One is stationed, and where it takes off from; and it takes the president around the country for various official engagements.

Automobiles 

The presidential state car is a highly modified 2018 Hyundai Nexo SUV first introduced in 2019  of which it is operated by the civilian Presidential Security Service. There are at least seven SUVs at the president's service.

See also
 President of South Korea 
 Code One
 Presidential state car (South Korea) 
 Presidential Helicopter (South Korea)
 List of official vehicles of the president of South Korea
 Official state car 
 Air transports of heads of state and government

References

Government of South Korea
Transport in South Korea
Transport of heads of state